George Morfogen (March 30, 1933 – March 8, 2019) was an American stage, film and TV actor. He is known for playing Bob Rebadow in the HBO show Oz, and for his role as Stanley Bernstein in the original V miniseries.

He was of Greek descent.

Biography 
He appeared at the Chelsea Theater Center of Brooklyn and at the off-Broadway Westside Theatre in Heinrich von Kleist's play, The Prince of Homburg. The play was videotaped for the PBS series, Great Performances, and later released as a DVD. A chapter in Davi Napoleon's book, Chelsea on the Edge: The Adventures of an American Theater describes the rehearsal process and the production.

Morfogen was lifelong friends with director Peter Bogdanovich, and was best man for Bogdanovich at his 1962 wedding to Polly Platt. Morfogen acted in five films directed by Bogdanovich: What's Up, Doc? (1972), Daisy Miller (1974), They All Laughed (1981; also producer), Illegally Yours (1988; also co-producer), and She's Funny That Way (2014). He worked off-screen on several other Bogdanovich movies; Morfogen was dialogue coach on At Long Last Love (1975), and associate producer on Saint Jack (1979) and Mask (1985).

In 2001 he reprised his role as Bob in the Off-Broadway premiere of Uncle Bob, by Austin Pendleton, who wrote the role with Morfogen in mind. Gale Harold, followed by Joseph Gordon-Levitt, played the character of Josh, Bob's nephew. The production, which was directed by Courtney Moorehead and produced by Steven Sendor, had 114 performances at The SoHo Playhouse.

He was a teacher at HB Studio. He died on March 8, 2019, 22 days before his 86th birthday. He was survived by his husband Gene Laughorne. They were partners for 51 years.

Filmography

References

External links

Interview with Off-Center, the Primary Stages Off-Broadway Oral History Project

1933 births
2019 deaths
American male film actors
American male stage actors
American male television actors
American gay actors
Male actors from New York City
American people of Greek descent